Agefreco Air was an air carrier operating in the Democratic Republic of the Congo from 1988 to 2007.

Accidents and incidents
 23 August 2001 - An Agrefreco Air / Victoria Air Antonov An-28 (registration 3C-ALL) from Bukavu's Kavume Airport to Kapmene airport boards additional passengers and minerals at Kama town airport.  Eight minutes after takeoff an engine fails and the Russian pilots divert to Bukavu, but crash at Mugogo 15 miles short of Kavumu, killing seven of eleven aboard.  The aircraft is reported to be owned by a Patrice Bashengezi.
 26 August 2007 - Agefreco/Great Lakes Business Company operated AN-26 departing Kongolo Airport (KOO) has engine failure at takeoff and crashes into a tree.  All three crew and eleven of twelve passengers are killed.  The aircraft is reported to have an insured value of US$300,000.

See also		
 Transport in the Democratic Republic of the Congo

References

Defunct airlines of the Democratic Republic of the Congo
Airlines established in 1988
Companies based in Kinshasa